GHW may refer to:

 Girdhariwala railway station, in Pakistan
 Ghw (trigraph), a Latin-script trigraph

See also
 George H. W. Bush, 41st president of the United States 
 Wiederkehr GHW-1 Cu-Climber, a glider